Luís Rómulo de Castro (born 9 December 1987), commonly known as Rómulo, is a Brazilian footballer.

References

External links
 

1987 births
Living people
Brazilian footballers
Brazilian expatriate footballers
Expatriate footballers in El Salvador
Brazilian expatriate sportspeople in El Salvador
Expatriate footballers in Malta
Brazilian expatriate sportspeople in Malta
Association football midfielders
Goianésia Esporte Clube players
Tarxien Rainbows F.C. players
C.D. Águila footballers